The 1949 Hamilton Tigers season was the second for the club in the Ontario Rugby Football Union after playing in the Interprovincial Rugby Football Union for 34 seasons since 1907. This would also be the last season for the Tigers as the club would merge with the Hamilton Wildcats following this season.

The Tigers finished in 1st place in the ORFU with a 10–2 record, but lost to the Montreal Alouettes in the Eastern Final.

Preseason

Regular season

Season Standings

Season schedule

Playoffs

Schedule

References

Hamilton Tiger-Cats seasons
Hamilton